Ponte Guglielmo Marconi, also known as Ponte Marconi, is a Roman bridge that connects Piazza Augusto Righi with Piazza Tommaso Edison, in Rome, in the Ostiense and Portuense districts.

Description 
The bridge was built between 1937 and 1955; the construction was interrupted because of World War II and was resumed only in 1953. The bridge was dedicated to Guglielmo Marconi, bearing the same name as the long avenue (Viale Guglielmo Marconi) through it.

Notes

Sources

Marconi
Bridges completed in 1955
Rome Q. X Ostiense
Rome Q. XI Portuense
1955 establishments in Italy